You might be looking for:
 World language
 Volapük